Gianni Nuti (born 8 September 1964 in Asti) is an Italian musicologist and politician.

He ran for Mayor of Aosta as an independent at the 2020 Italian local elections, supported by a centre-left coalition. He was elected at the second round with 53% and took office on 6 October 2020.

See also
2020 Italian local elections
List of mayors of Aosta

References

External links
 
 

1964 births
Living people
Italian musicologists
Mayors of Aosta
People from Asti